Earthrise is a famous photograph taken on the 1968 Apollo 8 space mission.

Earthrise may also refer to:

 Earthrise (1990 video game), a computer game by Interstel
 Earthrise (album), a 1984 album by the Tandy Morgan Band
 Earthrise (film), a 2018 documentary by Emmanuel Vaughan-Lee
 Earthrise (video game), a 2011 massively multiplayer online role-playing game by Masthead Studios
 Earthrise Engine
 Earthrise, a TV series on Al Jazeera English
 Earthrise, the second chapter to 2020's Transformers: War for Cybertron Trilogy cartoon
 Earthrise, a sub-orbital space "burial" mission by Celestis
 "Earthrise/Return", a song by Mannheim Steamroller from Fresh Aire V
 "Earthrise", a song by Camel from Mirage
 "Earthrise," a song by American rock band Starset on their 2021 album, Horizons
 Earth phase, astronomical views of Earthrise and related

See also
 Earth Rising, an American indie band